Francesco Scarlatti  (5 December 1666 – c.1741) was an Italian Baroque composer and musician and the younger brother of the better known Alessandro Scarlatti.

Francesco was ever to live under the shadow of his better known relatives, Alessandro Scarlatti (his elder brother) and his nephew, Domenico. However, Francesco himself was an accomplished musician and held a number of appointments.

Biography
Scarlatti was born in Palermo, Sicily. Due to the island being under the control of the Kingdom of Naples, Francesco went to study at the well-known Conservatorio in the city. His first appointment, following his studies, was as a violinist at the Chapel Royal in Naples. His appointment was controversial: a number of Neapolitan musicians resented the young provincial's influence at court.

In 1690, he married Rosalinda Albano. She died in 1706 after having given birth to five common children.

Francesco later travelled around Europe. He visited London in 1719; some sources suggest that this was on the invitation of Handel, whom he had met some years before in Italy. Hardly anything is known of his time in London. It is thought that he probably worked in theatre orchestras. Scarlatti was recommended to James Brydges, 1st Duke of Chandos by John Arbuthnot. Chandos, a patron of Handel, maintained a musical establishment at his main house, Cannons in Middlesex, but Scarlatti appears not to have joined it.

By 1724 Francesco Scarlatti was living in Dublin. His post was reported as "Master of Musick". Perhaps whilst in Ireland he remarried. The Dublin Journal of 1733 reports: "Jane Scarlatti, wife of Francis Scarlatti, Master of Musick, hath eloped from her said husband. This is to desire that nobody may give any credit to the said Jane Scarlatti on account of her said husband; for he will not pay any debts that she shall contract; nor answer any bills she may draw on him."

The last record of Francesco Scarlatti is in 1741, when he was apparently unavailable for a concert due to ill-health. No further record remains of Scarlatti. It is believed that he died in Dublin that year.

Selected works

Laetatus sum (Psalm 122) for SSATB with strings and continuo.

Dixit dominus (Psalm 110) for sixteen singers with orchestra. Dated 1702.
 Dixit Dominus - Chorus, trumpet, violins I & II, viola and continuo
 Donec ponam inimicos tuos - Bass I-IV, violin and continuo
 Virgam virtutis tuae - Chorus, trumpet, violins I & II, viola and continuo
 Tecum principium - Soprano I-IV, Alto I-IV violin, viola and continuo
 Juravit Dominus - Tenor I-IV, violin, continuo
 Dominus a dextris tuis - Chorus, trumpet, violins I & II, viola and continuo
 Judicabit in nationibus - Chorus, trumpet, violins I & II, viola and continuo
 De torrente in via bibet - soprano solo, trumpet, continuo
 Gloria Patri - Chorus, trumpet, violins I & II, viola and continuo

Messa, Kyrie and Gloria mass for 16 singers with instruments. Dated 1703.
 Kyrie - Chorus, trumpet, violins I & II, viola and continuo
 Gloria - Chorus, trumpet, violins I & II, viola and continuo
 Gratias agimus tibi - Soprano I-IV, violin and continuo
 Dominus Deus, Rex cœlestis - Alto I-IV, violin and continuo
 Dominie Fili unigenite - Tenor I-IV, violin and continuo
 Dominus Deus, Agnust Dei - Bass I-IV, violin, violincello and continuo
 Qui tollis peccata mundi (I) - Chorus, trumpet, violins I & II, viola and continuo
 Qui tollis peccata mundi (II) - Soprano I, violin I & II, viola and continuo
 Quoniam tu solus sanctus - Chorus, trumpet, violins I & II, viola and continuo
 Cum Sancto Spiritu - Chorus, trumpet, violins I & II, viola and continuo

Miserere (Psalm 51) for SSATB chorus with instruments. Dated March 24, 1714, this psalm-setting consists of eleven movements:
 Miserere mei - SSATB chorus, coronetts, sackbuts, violins I & II, viola and continuo
 Amplius lava me - Solo SSAT, violins I & II, viola and continuo
 Ecce enim - Solo alto and tenor, violins I & II, viola and continuo
 Asperges me hyssopo - Solo SAB, violins I & II, viola and continuo
 Cor mundum - SSATB chorus, coronetts, sackbuts, violins I & II, viola and continuo
 Ne proicias me - Solo alto and tenor, violins I & II, viola and continuo
 Docebo iniquos vias tuas - solo SSATB and continuo
 Sacrificium Deo - SSATB chorus, coronetts, sackbuts, violins I & II, viola and continuo
 Benigne fac Domine - Bass soloist and continuo
 Tunc acceptabis - SSATB chorus, coronetts, sackbuts, violins I & II, viola and continuo
 Gloria Patri - SSATB chorus, coronetts, sackbuts, violins I & II, viola and continuo

The autographed manuscripts for the "Messa" and "Dixit Dominus" are now at the Bodleian Library, Oxford. An authorized copy of the "Miserere" is kept in the Österreichische Nationalbibliothek, Vienna.

The Miserere, Dixit Dominus and the Mass were recorded for the first time in 2003 by the Armonico Consort, Concerto Gallese, the English Cornett and Sackbutt Ensemble and soprano soloist Dame Emma Kirkby directed by Christopher Monks.

References

1666 births
1741 deaths
18th-century Italian composers
18th-century Italian male musicians
Italian Baroque composers
Italian emigrants to Ireland
Italian male classical composers
Musicians from Palermo